Bobby Madden (12 December 1928 – 21 January 2008) was an Australian cricketer. He played seven first-class matches for New South Wales between 1949/50 and 1959/60.

See also
 List of New South Wales representative cricketers

References

External links
 

1928 births
2008 deaths
Australian cricketers
New South Wales cricketers
Cricketers from Sydney